Fredric Hope (January 22, 1900 – April 20, 1937) was an American art director. He won an Academy Award for Best Art Direction for the film The Merry Widow. He was born in New Brighton, Pennsylvania and died in Hollywood, California.

Selected filmography
 Romeo and Juliet (1936)
 The Merry Widow (1934)

References

External links

1900 births
1937 deaths
American art directors
Best Art Direction Academy Award winners